The Church of St. Francis Xavier is a church in Malacca City, Malacca, Malaysia.

History

The church was built in 1849 on the site of an old Portuguese church by a French priest, Father Farvé. The finishing touches of the building were completed in 1856 by Father Allard, with the present-day presbytery built in 1874.

Architecture
The church is a twin-spired neo-gothic structure. It is believed that the church was modeled after the Cathedral of St. Peter in Montpellier, Southern France, which closely followed the older church’s original construction, except for a portico which was added on in 1963.

See also
 List of tourist attractions in Melaka
 Christianity in Malaysia

References

Roman Catholic churches in Malaysia
Churches in Malacca
19th-century Roman Catholic church buildings in Malaysia